John Horridge (25 June 1893 – 27 December 1951), was a British Liberal Party politician and barrister.

Background
He was the son of Thomas Mowbray Horridge. He married, in 1934, Brita Charlotta Persson, of Malung, Sweden. They had two sons.

Diplomatic and legal career
He served during the European War in France from 1915–16, and Mesopotamia from 1917–18 reaching the rank of captain. In 1918 he was appointed to the Political Service, Persia, as Assistant Political Officer, at Kermanshah. From 1918–19 he served as Assistant Political Officer and Acting Vice-Consul at Hamadan. From 1919–20 he served the Civil Administration Mesopotamia, as Assistant Political Officer, at Khanaqin. In 1922 he was Called to the Bar at Lincoln's Inn. In 1937 he was appointed Barrister-at-Law and Master of the Supreme Court, King’s Bench Division.

Political career
He was Liberal candidate for the Sevenoaks Division of Kent at the 1935 general election. Sevenoaks was a safe Conservative seat that the Liberal Party had not won since 1923.

He did not stand for parliament again.

References

1893 births
1951 deaths